Admiral Sir George Willes Watson,  (5 April 1827 – 26 April 1897) was a Royal Navy officer who went on to be Commander-in-Chief, North America and West Indies Station.

Naval career
Watson joined the Royal Navy in 1841. Promoted to Commander in 1858, he was given command of HMS Peterel in 1862. Promoted to Captain in 1864, he went on to command HMS Crocodile, HMS Duncan, HMS Victor Emanuel and HMS  Temeraire. During the American Civil War he was accused of assisting the Confederate States of America by selling the cruiser CSS Florida to them.

He was appointed Commodore-in-Charge, Hong Kong from March 1876 to March 1879. His next appointment was Admiral-Superintendent, Chatham in 1881 and Commander-in-Chief, North America and West Indies Station in 1888 before retiring in 1892.

He was promoted to full admiral on 25 February 1892, and retired two months later.

Family
In 1864 he married Margaretta Campbell.

References

1827 births
1897 deaths
Royal Navy admirals
Knights Commander of the Order of the Bath